The rationality theorem is a theory introduced by political scientist Graham Allison in his book Essence of Decision: Explaining the Cuban Missile Crisis.

Allison defined the rationality theorem like this:

There exists no pattern of activity for which an imaginative analyst cannot write a large number of objective functions such that the pattern of activity maximizes each function.

He used the theorem to attack any social science analysis that assumes a measure of rationality on the part of the actors.

Political science theories